was an Amt ("collective municipality") in the district of Rendsburg-Eckernförde, in Schleswig-Holstein, Germany. It was named after the lake Wittensee, which is situated in the Amt. It was located between Eckernförde and Rendsburg. The village Groß Wittensee was the seat of the Amt. In January 2008, it was merged with the Amt Wittensee to form the Amt Hüttener Berge.

The Amt Wittensee consisted of the following municipalities:

Borgstedt 
Bünsdorf 
Groß Wittensee
Haby 
Holtsee 
Holzbunge 
Klein Wittensee 
Neu Duvenstedt 
Sehestedt

Former Ämter in Schleswig-Holstein